Stefan Denifl (born 22 September 1987) is an Austrian former professional cyclist, who rode professionally between 2006 and 2018 for seven different professional teams. In 2019, Denifl confessed to doping during a five-year period in his career, and was given a four-year ban from the sport; as a consequence of this, Denifl received a two-year sentence in 2021 for serious commercial fraud.

Career
Born in Fulpmes, Denifl began racing in 2001 with "Team Bike Denifl" as a mountain biker. In 2003, he moved to the road, riding for "Team ÖAMTC Recheis Lattella". From 2004, he focused on road cycling. In 2005, he was signed by Heiko Salzwedel for the T-Mobile Development Programme and included his first experience with the professional cyclists. In 2012, he rode for a year with  before joining  the following year. In October 2016,  announced that Denifl, alongside IAM team-mate Leigh Howard, would be part of their inaugural squad for the 2017 season. However, in December 2018 the team announced that they and Denifl had mutually agreed to cancel his contract due to personal reasons, which were not specified at the time.

Blood doping
In February 2019, Kronen Zeitung broke news that a number of professional cyclists had been implicated in the doping scandal uncovered at the FIS Nordic World Ski Championships. Later, Denifl confessed to blood doping in a police interview with CCC Team general manager Jim Ochowicz confirming that team's medical assessment of Denifl's biological passport showed no warning signs of blood doping. Denifl was handed a four-year ban on 27 June 2019. On 12 January 2021, it was announced that Denifl would receive a two-year prison sentence for fraud. The following year, the original judgement was overturned and went to a retrial.

Major results

2004
 3rd Road race, National Junior Road Championships
2005
 National Junior Road Championships
1st  Road race
2nd Time trial
 2nd Overall Trofeo Karlsberg
 6th Road race, UEC European Under-23 Road Championships
2007
 9th Eschborn-Frankfurt City Loop U23
2008 
 National Road Championships
1st  Time trial
1st  Under-23 time trial
 1st Eschborn-Frankfurt City Loop U23
 5th Overall Giro della Regione Friuli Venezia Giulia
2009
 1st  Overall Thüringen Rundfahrt der U23
 7th Overall Bayern–Rundfahrt
 8th Overall Tour of Austria
2010
 7th Overall Tour of Austria
 7th Overall Bayern–Rundfahrt
 8th Overall Vuelta a Castilla y León
2011
 5th Grand Prix Cycliste de Montréal
 9th Overall Grand Prix de Wallonie
2012
 5th Overall Tour du Limousin
2013
 1st  Mountains classification Bayern–Rundfahrt
 2nd Road race, National Road Championships
 5th Overall Circuit de la Sarthe
2014
 7th Overall Paris–Nice
2015
 1st  Mountains classification Tour de Suisse
 10th Overall Tour of Austria
1st  Austrian rider classification
2017 
 1st  Overall Tour of Austria
 1st Stage 17 Vuelta a España

Grand Tour general classification results timeline

References

External links

1987 births
Living people
Austrian male cyclists
People from Innsbruck-Land District
Cyclists at the 2016 Summer Olympics
Olympic cyclists of Austria
Sportspeople from Tyrol (state)
Doping cases in cycling
Austrian sportspeople in doping cases